This is a list of members of the South Australian House of Assembly from 2014 to 2018, as elected at the 2014 state election.

See also
 Members of the South Australian Legislative Council, 2014–2018

References

Members of South Australian parliaments by term
21st-century Australian politicians